Şahverdi Çetin (born 28 September 2000) is a German professional footballer who plays as a midfielder for Dutch club Dordrecht.

Professional career
Çetin joined the youth academy of Eintracht Frankfurt in 2013, and signed his first professional contract with them in 2017 before moving to Ankaragücü in 2020. Çetin made his professional debut with Ankaragücü in a 5-3 Süper Lig loss to Çaykur Rizespor on 17 October 2020.

On 13 January 2023, Çetin signed a 1.5-year contract with Dordrecht in the Netherlands.

International career
Born in Germany, Çetin is of Turkish descent. He is a youth international for Germany.

References

External links
 DFB Profile
 BDFutbol Profile

Living people
2000 births
Sportspeople from Mainz
German footballers
Germany youth international footballers
German people of Turkish descent
Association football midfielders
MKE Ankaragücü footballers
FC Dordrecht players
Süper Lig players
TFF First League players
Eerste Divisie players
German expatriate footballers
Expatriate footballers in Turkey
German expatriate sportspeople in Turkey
Expatriate footballers in the Netherlands
German expatriate sportspeople in the Netherlands